is a railway station in the city of Ōtawara, Tochigi, Japan, operated by the East Japan Railway Company (JR East).

Lines

Station layout
This station has one island platform and one side platform connected to the station building by a footbridge; however, platform 2 is not in use. The station is staffed.

Platforms

History
Nozaki Station opened on 25 February 1897. With the privatization of JNR on 1 April 1987, the station came under the control of JR East.

Passenger statistics
In fiscal 2019, the station was used by an average of 1306 passengers daily (boarding passengers only).

Surrounding area

See also
 List of railway stations in Japan

References

External links

 JR East station information 

Railway stations in Tochigi Prefecture
Tōhoku Main Line
Utsunomiya Line
Railway stations in Japan opened in 1897
Ōtawara
Stations of East Japan Railway Company]